Henry (Harry) Doggett (1853–1927) was a builder and mayor of the City of Brisbane in Queensland, Australia.

Public life
Harry Doggett was an alderman of the Brisbane City Council in 1901 to 1904 representing the Valley ward and again from 1908 to 1924. He was mayor in 1913.

He served on the following council committees:
 Finance Committee 1901, 1903, 1908, 1909, 1911, 1912, 1914, 1916, 1918, 1920-1921
 Legislative Committee 1901
 Building Act Committee 1901, 1902
 Works Committee 1902–1904, 1908, 1910, 1913, 1915, 1917, 1919, 1921–1923
 Health Committee 1908–1912, 1914–1918, 1921–1924
 General Purposes Committee 1908, 1911, 1922–1923.
 Parks Committee 1902, 1903, 1910, 1911, 1916, 1919–1921
 Buildings & Alignment of Roads Committee 1909–1912, 1914, 1917–1924
 Town Hall Special Committee 1910–1917, 1919–1924
 City of Brisbane Incorporation Act Committee 1912–1915
 New Parks Special Committee 1912, 1913
 Markets Committee 1912, 1915–1923
 City Engineer's Office Staff Special Committee 1912
 Wharves Special Committee 1913
 Lighting Committee 1914, 1915, 1921–1923
 Ferries & Baths Committee 1902, 1917
 Entertainments Special Committee 1920–1921

Personal life
Harry Doggett was born on 11 January 1853  at Bushey Heath, Hertfordshire, England, the son of John Doggett and his wife Mary Ann (née Barnett). He immigrated as a young child with his parents to Brisbane where they settled in Fortitude Valley. He married Catherine Wood in 1878 in Brisbane.

Harry Doggett built his own home at Arthur Street, Fortitude Valley. Now known as Doggetts Cottage, it is listed on the Queensland Heritage Register.

Doggett had been doing work on his home (Doggetts Cottage) when he died suddenly on Thursday 16 June 1927 aged 74 years. He was buried in Toowong Cemetery on Monday 20 June 1927. His wife predeceased him in 1921; he was survived by his son Albert Doggett.

See also
 List of mayors and lord mayors of Brisbane

References

Mayors and Lord Mayors of Brisbane
1927 deaths
English emigrants to Australia
People from Bushey
Burials at Toowong Cemetery
Pre-Separation Queensland
1853 births